Beaumont-en-Auge (literally Beaumont in Auge) is a commune in the Calvados department in the Normandy region in northwestern France. The town hosts one of the last kaleidoscope manufacturers in France.

Population

Notable people
Pierre-Simon Laplace (1749–1827), mathematician, physicist, astronomer and philosopher.
Jean-Charles Langlois (1789–1870), soldier and military commander during the Napoleonic Wars, painter of battles.

See also
 The brilliance of Beaumont-en-Auge; vintage and current images of the village with short bio of Laplace, famous mathematician astronomer born in the town
Communes of the Calvados department

References

Communes of Calvados (department)
Calvados communes articles needing translation from French Wikipedia
Pierre-Simon Laplace